The women's singles competition of the bowling events at the 2015 Pan American Games was held on July 24 and 25  at Planet Bowl (Pan Am Bowling Centre), due to naming rights the venue was known as the latter for the duration of the games.

Schedule
All times are Eastern Standard Time (UTC-3).

Qualification

A total of 14 countries qualified two bowlers each through various events. This is summarized below.

Medalists

Results

Qualification

Semifinals

Final

References

Bowling at the 2015 Pan American Games